The 2005 Mountain West Conference men's basketball tournament was played at Pepsi Center in Denver, Colorado from March 9–12, 2005.  Second-seeded New Mexico upset regular season league champion Utah 60–56 in the championship game to win the Mountain West Conference tournament and the league's automatic bid to the NCAA Tournament.  It was the first time in the history of the tournament that the league's top two seeds advanced to the title tilt.

This marked the final conference tournament played under the league's original 8-team format.  TCU joined the Mountain West in the 2005–06 athletic year.  From that point on, the tournament adopted a first round play-in game, pitting the 8th and 9th place teams against each other for the right to play the regular season MWC champion in the tournament quarterfinals.

Bracket

Mountain West Conference men's basketball tournament
Tournament
Mountain West Conference men's basketball tournament
Mountain West Conference men's basketball tournament
Basketball competitions in Denver
College sports tournaments in Colorado